Ercilla is a genus of plants in the Phytolaccaceae family containing three species: Ercilla volubilis, Ercilla spicata, and Ercila syncarpellata.

References 

Phytolaccaceae
Caryophyllales genera